Sachin–Jigar is an Indian music composer,singer,music producer,music director and arranger duo consisting of Sachin Sanghvi and Jigar Saraiya. They compose for Hindi and Gujarati language films. Before working independently as music directors, they served as orchestrators for Pritam.

Early life
Both Sachin and Jigar are Gujaratis based in Mumbai, Maharashtra.

Career
Sachin–Jigar have created music at various platforms from theatre to television soaps to jingles. They must have done not less than 500 plays and not less than 5000 television episodes for various genres and channels. Jigar was assisting music director Rajesh Roshan where he met Amit Trivedi, who in turn introduced him to Sachin. Later that year they joined their hands and started assisting Pritam in setting up musical arrangements.

They then programmed and arranged for almost all music directors in Bollywood from A.R. Rahman, Amit Trivedi, Anu Malik and Nadeem-Shravan to Sandesh Shandilya, Pritam, Vishal–Shekhar etc., before they stepped in to be independent composers in 2009.

In 2009, they composed one song for the film Life Partner, which primarily featured songs by their mentor Pritam. Then in 2011, their first assignment as an independent music director duo was for the film F.A.L.T.U which included the hit songs  "Le Ja Tu Mujhe" & "Char Baj Gaye (Party Abhi Baaki Hai)". In 2011, they scored for Hum Tum Shabana & Shor in the City. In the latter, the song Saibo, sung by Shreya Ghoshal and Tochi Raina, was specially appreciated by critics as well as masses and the song Karma Is A Bitch became a huge hit.

After that, they composed music for Tere Naal Love Ho Gaya (2012), one song each for Kyaa Super Kool Hain Hum (2012), OMG: Oh My God! (2012) and Ajab Gazabb Love (2012), full albums for ABCD: Any Body Can Dance (2013) and Jayantabhai Ki Luv Story (2013), one song for Himmatwala (2013), two songs for I, Me Aur Main (2013), and full albums for Go Goa Gone (2013) and Ramaiya Vastavaiya (2013).

They next composed music for the film Issaq and collaborated with Yash Raj films via the highly successful Shuddh Desi Romance directed by Maneesh Sharma.

In 2014, they composed three original songs for the film Humpty Sharma Ki Dulhania produced by Karan Johar under the banner of Dharma Productions and directed by Shashank Khaitan which had hit songs such as 'Saturday Saturday' & 'Samjhavan', composed by their album collaborators Sharib-Toshi. It was the first time for the duo working for Dharma Productions. The second album that year was the Akshay Kumar starrer Entertainment directed by the famous writer duo Sajid-Farhad, while their third album that year came with Happy Ending, written and directed by Raj & DK. They ended the year with a hit song, "Dance Basanti", for the film Ungli, starring Emraan Hashmi.

In 2015, their first film was Badlapur whose first single "Jee Karda" was released on 9 December 2014 and was an instant hit. Another single "Jeena Jeena" was released on 15 January 2015 which was a blockbuster song. The album for Disney's ABCD 2 became a hit as well. The song "Sun Sathiya" is widely regarded by many as one of the favourites from this album. Later that year, they composed two songs for Hero, a remake of Subhash Ghai's original film of the same name, which marked their first collaboration with actor-producer Salman Khan.

The next year, they composed for A Flying Jatt. In 2017, they came back with two original songs for Hindi Medium, which also had the chartbuster song, "Suit Suit", sung by Guru Randhawa. They next composed for the Ayushmann Khurrana-Parineeti Chopra starrer Meri Pyaari Bindu, the Kangana Ranaut starrer Simran and Sanjay Dutt starrer Bhoomi, while also composing songs and score for A Gentleman, which included the famous "Bandook Meri Laila".

In 2018, they composed the songs for Stree, starring Rajkummar Rao and Shraddha Kapoor, which was a huge success, with its songs topping the charts. In 2019, their projects included the spoof comedy Arjun Patiala, the drama Made in China and one of the year's biggest hits, Bala, again starring Ayushmann Khurrana, but being his second film not to feature his vocals on any song.

Sachin & Jigar have also mesmerized the crowd with their musical contribution in Coke Studio India.

Discography
All songs are in Hindi else marked otherwise.

Jigar Saraiya as singer

Sachin Sanghvi as singer

Personal life
Jigar Saraiya is married to singer and lyricist Priya Saraiya. Sachin's daughter is Taniskha Sanghvi, who is known for the song Laadki.

Awards and nominations
 2013: 6th Gujarat Gauravvant Award
 2016: GIFA: Best Music Album:Wrong Side Raju

References

Indian film score composers
Musicians from Mumbai
Indian musical duos
Gujarati people
Indian male film score composers
Gujarati playback singers